Murray House is a commercial building in Hong Kong.

Murray House may also refer to:

Russey-Murray House, Howard County, Arkansas, formerly listed on the National Register of Historic Places (NRHP)
Jonathan Murray House, Madison, Connecticut
Thomas Murray House (Davenport, Iowa)
Richards-Murray House, Glendale, Kentucky, listed on the NRHP
William Murray House, Salem, Massachusetts
Robert Murray House, Waltham, Massachusetts
James H. Murray House, Linden, Michigan, listed on the NRHP
John L. Murray House, Lloyd Murray House, and William Murray House, part of the Murray's Mill Historic District, Catawba County, North Carolina
Thomas J. Murray House, Mars Hill, North Carolina
Long, McCorkle and Murray Houses, Newton, North Carolina
Thomas Murray House (Clearfield, Pennsylvania)
McCollum-Murray House, Greeleyville, South Carolina
George Murray House (Park City, Utah), listed on the NRHP
Thomas Murray House (Virginia Beach, Virginia)
James F. Murray House, Chester, West Virginia
George Murray House (Racine, Wisconsin)

See also
Pauli Murray Family Home